Tony Schaller was a Belgian writer. His work was part of the literature event in the art competition at the 1928 Summer Olympics.

References

Year of birth missing
Year of death missing
20th-century Belgian male writers
Olympic competitors in art competitions
Place of birth missing